The Boston Junior Shamrocks was a Junior A hockey team playing in the Eastern Junior Hockey League.

History
The franchise, then known as the Matt O'Neil Club, is a charter member of the Eastern Junior Hockey League (EJHL) since 1993.  It played as the Matt O'Neil Club until 1996, as the Matt O'Neil Lightning from 1996 until 1998, when it changed its name to the Boston Harbor Wolves.  In 2007 the team adopted the Junior Shamrocks name...The original logo of the Matt O'Neill club was a shamrock.

In 2007 Gary Ford gained ownership of the Junior Shamrocks. In their first season as the Junior Shamrocks the team went 3-40-1 finishing with only 7 points.

In the 2008-2009 season the Shamrocks had their ups and downs. One of theirs ups was defeating EJHL powerhouse the New Hampshire Jr. Monarchs  5-2 on October 10, 2008.
Some their low points include a 16 to 6 loss at the hands of the Boston Jr. Bruins in November 2008 and a 16-1 loss to the New Hampshire Jr. Monarchs in January 2009.

The team was coached by former Boston College Eagle John Maclean. Maclean also is owner of Dynamic Skating in North Andover, Mass and is a former assistant coach at Merrimack College.
He is also an NHL scout.

In the two years of Junior Shamrocks existence. 2008-2009 forward Rob Sorrenti goes down as the teams all time leading scorer with 14 goals and 28 assists for 42 total points.

The teams 2008-2009 All-Stars were captains Reed Hersey and Jake Lewis.

In the spring of 2009 the Boston Jr. Shamrocks were sold and relocated to an ownership group outside of Philadelphia. The team is now called the Philadelphia Revolution who competes in the Eastern Junior Hockey League, The Empire Junior Hockey League, and the Continental Hockey Association.

Notable alumni
Ryan Columbus 1996-1997 (Captain)
Keith Wallace 1996-1997 (Captain) 
Phil Coleman, 1993–1995
Rob DeMarco, 1994–1995
Bruce Niemiec, 1996–1999
Luke Niemiec, 1996–1999
David Wasdyke, 1997–1998
Peter Ward, 1997–1998
Nathan Stackhouse, 1997–1998
Stephen Dixon, 1997–1998
Shane Coleman, 1996–1998
James Aborn, 1997–1999
Bryan Beers, 1997–1998
James Considine, 1997–1999
John Carter
Chris Theiss
Steve Hoar
Bobby Greenburg
Joseph Huff, 1994–1995
Tomo Tamaki, 1996–1998
James Mahoney, 1996-1998
Aaron Constable, 1996-1997
Chris Franco 1993-1996

Season-by-season results

External links
 

1993 establishments in Massachusetts
2009 disestablishments in Massachusetts
Defunct ice hockey teams in the United States
Hingham, Massachusetts
Ice hockey clubs disestablished in 2009
Ice hockey clubs established in 1993
Ice hockey teams in Massachusetts
Sports in Plymouth County, Massachusetts